McCoy's may refer to:

 A British potato snack
 The public house in Fair City

See also
McCoy (disambiguation)